American Leadership Academy (ALA) is a regional group of tuition-free public charter schools headquartered in Queen Creek, Arizona which provides education for K-12 students. ALA currently consists of 12 schools located in Arizona and as of the 2019–2020 school year, enrollment exceeded 10,500 students.

There is no known official affiliation between American Leadership Academy and the K-12 school of the same name in Spanish Fork, Utah.

 


History

Campuses and locations

Queen Creek Campus

Referred to as "The Home of the ALA Patriots," this campus is located on the southwest corner of E. Chandler Heights Blvd. and S. Hawes Rd. in Queen Creek, Arizona and features the following schools and facilities:
 American Leadership Academy - Queen Creek High School
 American Leadership Academy - Queen Creek Elementary School
 American Leadership Academy District Offices

Ironwood Campus

This campus, known also as "The Home of the ALA Warriors," is located on W. Combs Rd. (between S. Rittenhouse Rd. and N. Gantzel Rd.) in Queen Creek, Arizona and features the following schools:
 American Leadership Academy - Ironwood High School
 American Leadership Academy - Ironwood Elementary School

Gilbert North Campus

Dubbed as "The Home of the ALA Eagles," this campus is located on the northwest corner of S. Higley Rd. and the Santan Freeway in Gilbert, Arizona and features the following schools:
 American Leadership Academy - Gilbert North High School
 American Leadership Academy - Gilbert North Elementary School

They won the 2022 4A Football State Championship.

West Foothills Campus

This campus is known as "The Home of the  Guardians," this campus is located West of AZ Loop 303 on Olive Ave in Waddell, Arizona and features the following schools:
 American Leadership Academy - West Foothills High School
 American Leadership Academy - West Foothills Elementary School

Other Locations

There are also several independent schools not located on a major campus. They are as follows:
 American Leadership Academy - Gilbert Elementary
 American Leadership Academy - Gilbert South Elementary
 American Leadership Academy - Mesa Elementary
 American Leadership Academy - Signal Butte Elementary
 American Leadership Academy - San Tan Valley Elementary
 American Leadership Academy - Anthem South Elementary

References

External links
 American Leadership Academy
 ALA Schools

Public high schools in Arizona
Charter schools in Arizona
2009 establishments in Arizona